The 2016 Lamar Hunt U.S. Open Cup tournament proper will feature teams from all five tiers of men's soccer of the American Soccer Pyramid.

Starting with the 2016 tournament, US Soccer took over the qualifying process that used to be handled by each association. According to US Soccer, all teams within the Division I, II, & III professional leagues will qualify automatically as in past years. Any national league not in the top three divisions can apply to use previous year's league standings as their qualification method. Remaining teams will participate in up to five qualifying rounds to determine entrants into the tournament proper. In prior years, slots were allocated and the individual associations created tournaments and qualifiers to determine their representatives. Final slot allocation will be determined when team registration has concluded.

As of September 8, 2015, US Soccer has made the decision to ban all lower division teams that are majority owned by a higher division team. This means Bethlehem Steel, LA Galaxy 2, New York Red Bulls 2, Orlando City B, Portland Timbers 2, Real Monarchs, Seattle Sounders 2, and Swope Park Rangers (all from the United Soccer League) will not qualify for the 2016 tournament. On November 5, 2015, New York Cosmos Chief Operating Officer Erik Stover stated that eligible New York Cosmos B would not enter as "the integrity of the tournament is more important".  Just before the tournament, USL side Rio Grande Valley FC Toros and their MLS parent Houston Dynamo asked that RGVFC be banned from the tournament by US Soccer.  While RGVFC is not owned by the Dynamo, the MLS side staffs and coaches the Toros.

Local Qualifying Track (56)

First qualifying round

Second qualifying round

Third qualifying round
On February 3, teams scheduled for the Third Qualifying Round received letters from USSF advising them that due to the withdrawal of some professional teams (the USL clubs mentioned above), the round was cancelled and all twelve teams had qualified for the First Round of the main tournament along with the two teams who had received prior byes.

Teams scheduled to receive byes to the First Round
 San Francisco City FC
 Harpo's FC

Teams scheduled to play in the Third Qualifying Round before cancellation
 West Chester United
 Southie FC
 Lansdowne Bhoys FC
 New York Pancyprian-Freedoms
 Motagua New Orleans
 NTX Rayados
 La Maquina
 Outbreak FC
 L.A. Wolves FC
 San Nicolas FC
 Aromas Café FC
 Boca Raton Football Club

National League Track

Premier Development League (15)

On September 16, 2015, US Soccer announced the 15 PDL sides for the US Open Cup listed below.  2015 league results were used to determine the qualifying teams.

Kitsap Pumas  (Northwest Division Winner) (Granted bye to Second Round due to late withdrawal of Rio Grande Valley FC)
Burlingame Dragons FC  (Southwest Division Winner)
Charlotte Eagles  (South Atlantic Division Winner)
Des Moines Menace  (Heartland Division Winner)
FC Tucson  (Mountain Division Winner)
GPS Portland Phoenix  (Northeast Division Winner)
Michigan Bucks  (Great Lakes Division Winner)
Mississippi Brilla (Mid South Division Winner)
New York Red Bulls U-23 (Mid Atlantic Division Winner)
Ocala Stampede (Southeast Division Winner)
Jersey Express  (At-Large Berth)
Long Island Rough Riders  (At-Large Berth)
Reading United  (At-Large Berth)
Seacoast United Phantoms  (At-Large Berth)
Ventura County Fusion  (At-Large Berth)

National Premier Soccer League (13)

On September 13, 2015, the NPSL announced the 13 NPSL sides for the US Open Cup listed below. Detroit City was added later as a late addition at-large berth due to the withdrawal of New York Cosmos B. 2015 league results were used to determine the qualifying teams.

New York Cosmos B (Championship Game Winner) †
Chattanooga FC (Championship Runner-Up) (Granted bye to Second Round due to late withdrawal of Rio Grande Valley FC)
CD Aguiluchos USA (Playoff Semifinalist)
Indiana Fire (Playoff Semifinalist)
AFC Cleveland (Playoff Quarterfinalist)
Clarkstown SC Eagles (Playoff Quarterfinalist)
Myrtle Beach Mutiny (Playoff Quarterfinalist)
Sacramento Gold (Playoff Quarterfinalist)
Atlanta Silverbacks Reserves (At-Large Berth)
FC Wichita (At-Large Berth)
Fredericksburg FC (At-Large Berth)
Miami Fusion FC (At-Large Berth)
New York Athletic Club (At-Large Berth)
Detroit City FC (At-Large Berth)

† Withdrew on November 5, 2015

References

External links
 U.S. Soccer Federation
 TheCup.us - Unofficial U.S. Open Cup News

U.S. Open Cup